Zaozhuang is a prefecture-level city in the south of Shandong province, People's Republic of China. Since January 2019 (after the Laiwu prefecture got incorporated into Jinan prefecture), the smallest prefecture-level city in the province, it borders Jining to the west and north, Linyi to the east, and the province of Jiangsu to the south. The Battle of Taierzhuang occurred in the city during the Second Sino-Japanese War in 1938. The Second Sino-Japanese War (1937–45) had a significant impact on Zaozhuang.

Archaeologists have found evidence of human activities in this region dating back to the Neolithic era. Its culture started from 7300 years ago of ancestor culture, and developed to city-state culture 4300 years ago, then evolved to canal culture 2700 years ago, and finally stepped to industrial culture 130 years ago.

Its population is 3,855,601 at the 2020 census whom 975,539 in the built-up area made of Shizhong and Yicheng districts.

History

The history of Zaozhuang is closely linked to the canal. According to archaeological discoveries, the earliest canal in the territory, the Qianyang Canal, was excavated in the Spring and Autumn Period. The Zaozhuang section of the Jinghang Canal was excavated in the 32nd year of Ming Wanli (1604), flowing through the city's Taierzhuang, Yucheng, Xuecheng and Tengzhou, with a total length of 93.9 kilometers, from Xiazhen Lijiagang to Zhangzhou. The estuary enters the Yellow River, because the Weihe River is the main supplementary water source. Its opening has changed the situation that the Beijing-Hangzhou Expressway is unreasonable due to the flooding of the Yellow River. For hundreds of years, it has played an important role in the transportation of Nanliangbei, material circulation and cultural exchange. The continuity of the Beijing-Hangzhou Grand Canal also promotes economic prosperity along the canal area. Taierzhuang along the coast has rapidly developed into a “lunan town”, and “Yixian County” records: “Taierzhuangtun Canal, merchants are convinced, Tianyibi, and Xuyi is also a city.” The gathering of merchants brings cultural blending, Taierzhuang The ancient city has also become a typical representative of the canal culture. It has the most distinctive features of the blending of north and south cultures on the Beijing-Hangzhou Grand Canal and the combination of Chinese and Western cultures.

Zaozhuang is a heroic city with a glorious revolutionary tradition. In the 27th year of the Republic of China (1938), under the leadership of Li Zongren, commander of the Fifth Theater, the vast Lunan area with Taierzhuang as the center of gravity and the Japanese invaders engaged in the large-scale Battle of Tai'erzhuang, considered the first Chinese victory in the Second Sino-Japanese War. Two years later, in 1940, under the leadership of the Chinese Communist Party, the railway guerrillas established in Zaozhuang and the Chinese army fought bravely to defeat the Japanese invaders with guerrilla tactics.

Administration

The prefecture-level city of Zaozhuang administers six county-level divisions, including five districts and one county-level city. The seat of Zaozhuang is Xuecheng District. 
Shizhong District
Xuecheng District
Shanting District
Yicheng District
Tai'erzhuang District
Tengzhou City

These are further divided into 62 township-level divisions, including 44 towns, two townships and 16 subdistricts.

Coal-Mining History

Zaozhuang City long been important in coal-mining in China. The coal mining were developed prior to World War II, although it was severely damaged during the latter part of World War II. In 1954, the coal production brought back in production, since then it modernized the progress and connects those of Jiawang and Xuzhou in northern Jiangsu province. After years of economic restructuring and environmental remediation, Zaozhuang is now back to an eco-friendly city.

Geography

Zaozhuang City is located in the southern part of the low hills of Luzhong, and belongs to the Huanghuai Plain. The terrain is high in the north, low in the south, low in the east and low in the west, and it is inclined to the northeast to the southwest. The mountain in the northern Shanting District is 620 meters above sea level, which is the highest point in the city. The mountains, such as the Lianqing Mountain and the Baoji Mountain, are more than 500 meters above sea level, and the mountains are undulating and swaying in the north of the city. Holding 580 meters above sea level, it is called "the first of the seventy-two scorpions." The western lakeside and the coastal zone have the lowest terrain and flat ground, with an altitude of 30–40 meters and a minimum elevation of 24.5 meters. The topography and landforms in the territory are relatively complex, forming many types of landforms such as low mountains, hills, piedmont plains, floodplains, and lakes along the lake. The hills account for 54.6% of the total area, the plains account for 26.6% of the total area, and the depression accounts for 18.8% of the total area.

Climate
Zaozhuang has a monsoon-influenced humid subtropical climate, with four distinct seasons, summers are long and hot and humid and winters are cold and dry, spring and autumn are short and cool and mostly dry, but air humidly is high.

Transportation

Zaozhuang and Zaozhuang West are stops on both the Beijing-Shanghai high-speed railway and the Beijing-Shanghai (Jinghu) railway. Since 15 May 2016, the Zaolin railway (from Zaozhuang West to Linyi) has connected the city with the Yanri railway. 
Based on Shandong Province's planning, Zaozhuang will be linked with Linyi (to east), Heze (to west) and Jinan (to north) by the inter-city rail by 2022.

The Beijing-Fuzhou highway also passes through Zaozhuang  from north to south.

Zaozhuang has already augmented whole city's transportation by bus rapid transportation (BRT).

Culture 
Dishes include spicy chicken, vegetable pancakes, Spicy chicken soup with eggs, mutton soup, and more.

Notable people
Lu Ban (c. 507–444 BC), Chinese carpenter, engineer, revered as the Chinese god of builders and contractors.
Micius (ca. 480 BC – 390 BC), Warring States era philosopher and thinker
Lord Mengchang (died 279 BC), one of the famed Four Lords of the Warring States period.
Xi Zhong, China's fabled first wheelmaker, featured in Wumen Huikai's The Gateless Barrier (8th verse), whose wheel is earlier alluded to in the Tao Te Ching (11th verse) and other works. The Xi Zhong Culture Park is in Zaozhuang.

References

External links
Zaozhuang City

Cities in Shandong
Prefecture-level divisions of Shandong